Gymnoscopelus is a genus of lanternfishes. The name is from the Greek gymnos, "naked" and skopelos, "lanternfish."

They can live in extremely cold water; two species, Gymnoscopelus nicholsi and Gymnoscopelus braueri, have been recorded at up to 75°S in the Ross Sea.

Species 
There are currently eight recognized species in this genus:
 Gymnoscopelus bolini Andriashev, 1962
 Gymnoscopelus braueri (Lönnberg, 1905)
 Gymnoscopelus fraseri (Fraser-Brunner, 1931)
 Gymnoscopelus hintonoides Hulley, 1981 (False-midas lanternfish)
 Gymnoscopelus microlampas Hulley, 1981 (Minispotted lanternfish)
 Gymnoscopelus nicholsi (C. H. Gilbert, 1911) (Nichol's lanternfish)
 Gymnoscopelus opisthopterus Fraser-Brunner, 1949
 Gymnoscopelus piabilis (Whitley, 1931) (Southern blacktip lanternfish)

References 

Myctophidae
Extant Pliocene first appearances
Taxa named by Albert Günther
Marine fish genera